Manuel Charly Angiulli (born 26 June 1995) is a Belgium professional footballer who plays as a defender.

Career
Angiulli started his career with Belgian second division side Visé.

In 2014, he signed for Alemannia Aachen II in the German fifth division.

In 2020, Angiulli signed for Romanian club Politehnica Iași, where he made 3 appearances and scored 0 goals. On 11 November 2020, he debuted for Politehnica Iași during a 1-0 win over CFR Cluj.

Before the second half of 2020–21, Angiulli signed for MVV in the Netherlands.

On 27 July 2021, he signed a two-year deal with Mouscron.

References

External links
 
 

1995 births
Footballers from Liège
Belgian people of Italian descent
Living people
Belgian footballers
Association football defenders
C.S. Visé players
Alemannia Aachen players
R.E. Virton players
FC Politehnica Iași (2010) players
MVV Maastricht players
Royal Excel Mouscron players
Belgian Third Division players
Oberliga (football) players
Challenger Pro League players
Liga I players
Eerste Divisie players
Belgian expatriate footballers
Expatriate footballers in Germany
Belgian expatriate sportspeople in Germany
Expatriate footballers in Romania
Belgian expatriate sportspeople in Romania
Expatriate footballers in the Netherlands
Belgian expatriate sportspeople in the Netherlands